Clifford Robinson is the name of:

Clifford Robinson (basketball, born 1966) (1966–2020), American basketball player in the NBA from 1989 to 2007
Cliff Robinson (basketball, born 1960), American basketball player in the NBA from 1979 to 1991
Clifford William Robinson (1866–1944), Canadian politician
Cliff Robinson (artist), British comic book artist
Cliff Robinson, former Chairman of West Sussex County Council, 1993-97